Gil Jourdan is a Belgian detective comic strip created by Maurice Tillieux. It is a combination of mystery, adventure and humour.

Origin and premise
In 1956 the Belgian comic magazine Héroïc Albums ceased publication. Felix, the adventures of a young bespectacled detective written and drawn by Maurice Tillieux, was among the casualties, but returned in Spirou magazine as Gil Jourdan, though without the glasses.

Jourdan made his first appearance in a rather original manner: in issue 962 of Spirou, the bungling police Inspector Crouton takes wisecracking burglar Libellule out of prison in order to proceed to a reconstruction of a theft for which he has been arrested. Libellule is then snatched from right under Crouton's nose by a young man named Gil Jourdan. Jourdan is a private investigator in need of a big break and he thinks that Libellule's burglary skills could be useful in exposing a gang of popaïne [sic] smugglers.

Once the smugglers' ring had been captured, the trio of Jourdan, Libellule and Crouton would proceed to handle other cases which sometimes took them from France to South America and the Middle East, Libellule and Crouton providing the comic relief which contrasted with Jourdan's earnest nature. Looking on was Queue-de-Cerise, Jourdan's secretary who sometimes also helped out in the investigations.

Main characters

Publication and legacy
First appearing in Spirou magazine, Jourdan's adventures were then published in book form and even as omnibus editions which included short stories and other Tillieux detectives like Bob Slide (an FBI man in the 1930s), Felix (the original Jourdan) and Marc Jaguar (another detective).

In later years the drawing was entrusted to the artist Gos while Tillieux stuck to the writing. Tillieux' death in a car accident in 1978 brought an end to the series, though a number of short stories by other artists were drawn and published in homage to him and Jourdan some ten years later.

Notes on some of the stories
A short story La poursuite (The Pursuit) was published in issue 1316 of Spirou in 1963 and acted as a prequel to the series. In it Crouton makes several desperate attempts to arrest Libellule. This story takes place before either of them meets Jourdan.

Jourdan's early adventures were banned in France by the censor, who objected to the portrayal of the French police, represented by Crouton, as bungling, incompetent no-hopers. Crouton later became a more efficient police officer, even if he was sometimes a bit slow on deductions. The ban was later lifted.

La rue perdue (The Lost Street), published in 1978, was set in 1953 and was thus yet another prequel to the series. The story is also notable for being published in the quarterly magazine Tintin Special (see Tintin magazine), Spirou'''s main competitor. Sadly and ironically it was also Tillieux's final Jourdan adventure.

Stories
To date four of Jourdan's adventures have been published in English. Below is a list of the French titles, their year of publication, an English translation of the titles and a brief description. They are listed in order of publication.

By Tillieux

Post-Tillieux
The series ended in 1978 following Tillieux's death. Ten years later Soleils Editions published the comic book L'Hommage à Gil Jourdan - Les enquêtes de leurs amis ("Homage to Gil Jourdan - Their Friends' Cases") with the approval of Tillieux's family. It featured Jourdan and his colleagues in adventures written and drawn by other writers and artists, including several leading ones such as Pierre Seron, Turk, Éric Maltaite and Tillieux's former assistant Stephen Desberg. The stories also featured some of the crooks from the Tillieux period returning and seeking revenge. Tillieux had been notable for not using the same enemy twice. The cover was drawn by François Walthéry.

English translations
In August 2011, Fantagraphics published a translated volume, collecting the third and fourth volume of the original series.

In popular culture
In the Belgian Comic Strip Center in Brussels the permanent exhibition brings homage to the pioneers of Belgian comics, among them Maurice Tillieux and "Gil Jourdan".

Gil Jourdan is among the many Belgian comics characters to jokingly have a Brussels street named after them. The Rue des Bouchers/Lange Beenhouwersstraat has a commemorative plaque with the name Rue Gil Jourdan/ Guus Slim  straat placed under the actual street sign.

In May 2009 a wall was dedicated to Gil Jourdan'' in the Leopold I-straat/Rue Leopold I 201 in Laeken, Belgium as part of the Brussels' Comic Book Route. There are also two mural paintings dedicated to the series in Auderghem, one in the Rue du Vieux Moulin/Oudemolenstraat and the other in the Rue Emile Idiers/Emile Idiers straat.

Sources

External links
 Dupuis page for Gil Jourdan collection (in French)
 English fan page
  Tillieux rarity books - Elan publisher - Editions de l'Elan (french)
 Large Tillieux fan site (in French)

Belgian comic strips
Bandes dessinées
Jourdan, Gil
Dupuis titles
Detective comics
Adventure comics
Jourdan, Gil
Belgian comics titles
1956 comics debuts
Jourdan, Gil
1978 comics endings
Jourdan, Gil
Jourdan, Gil
Comics set in Belgium